Blanka Stajkow (born 23 May 1999), known mononymously as Blanka, is a Polish singer and model. She is scheduled to represent Poland in the Eurovision Song Contest 2023 with the song "Solo".

Early life
Stajkow was born in Szczecin to a Polish mother who works as a model and a Bulgarian father who works as a rich businessman. According to Stajkow, neither of her parents have a musical background. Her mother would encourage her from an early age to try various activities, including joining disco dance groups and going to music schools. In an interview, Stajkow would mention that during her mornings, her mother would always turn on either MTV or Trace Urban, which would encourage her to go into the music industry.

At the age of 13, she would decide to make and release her first single, "Strong Enough".

Career

Top Model and Warner Music Poland (2021–2022) 
In 2021, she participated in Top Model, a Polish reality television show. While on the show, she officially released her first official single, "Better". The following year, she signed a contract with Warner Music Poland, and released her second single, "Solo".

Eurovision Song Contest (2023) 
She won the contest, receiving maximum points from the jury and scoring second in public voting. As a result, she will be the representative of Poland in the Eurovision Song Contest 2023. The choice sparked an international outrage due to alleged rigged votes and the entry is currently investigated due to jury corruption allegations with the broadcaster not releasing the full vote spreadsheet.

Discography

Singles

As lead artist

Promotional singles

References 

Living people
1999 births
21st-century Polish women singers
Eurovision Song Contest entrants for Poland
Eurovision Song Contest entrants of 2023
Polish people of Bulgarian descent
Musicians from Szczecin
Polish female models